Fairgrounds is a neighborhood of the city of New Orleans.  A subdistrict of the Mid-City District Area, its boundaries as defined by the New Orleans City Planning Commission are: Florida Avenue, Dugue, Treasure, Republic and Abundance Streets to the north, North Broad Street to the east, Esplanade Avenue to the south and Bayou St. John to the west.

Geography

Adjacent neighborhoods
 St. Bernard Projects (north)
 St. Roch (north)
 Seventh Ward (east)
 Bayou St. John (south)
 City Park (west)

Boundaries
The New Orleans City Planning Commission defines the boundaries of Fairgrounds as these streets: Florida Avenue, Dugue Street, Treasure Street, Republic Street, Abundance Street, North Broad Street, Esplanade Avenue and Bayou St. John.

Landmarks and cityscape
Neighborhood landmarks include the Fair Grounds Race Course which gives the neighborhood its name, and Saint Louis Cemetery #3.

The remainder of the neighborhood is predominantly residential, with some local businesses along Esplanade Avenue, Ponce de Leon Street, and Gentilly Road.

Demographics
As of the census of 2000, there were 6,575 people, 2,983 households, and 1,551 families living in the neighborhood.  The population density was 7,558 /mi² (2,859 /km).

As of the census of 2010, there were 5,192 people, 2,496 households, and 1,162 families living in the neighborhood.

See also
 New Orleans neighborhoods

References

Neighborhoods in New Orleans